The 1940s (pronounced "nineteen-forties" and commonly abbreviated as "the '40s" or "the Forties") was a decade that began on January 1, 1940, and ended on December 31, 1949.

Most of World War II took place in the first half of the decade, which had a profound effect on most countries and people in Europe, Asia, and elsewhere. The consequences of the war lingered well into the second half of the decade, with a war-weary Europe divided between the jostling spheres of influence of the Western world and the Soviet Union, leading to the beginning of the Cold War. To some degree internal and external tensions in the post-war era were managed by new institutions, including the United Nations, the welfare state, and the Bretton Woods system, facilitating the post–World War II economic expansion, which lasted well into the 1970s. The conditions of the post-war world encouraged decolonization and the emergence of new states and governments, with India, Pakistan, Israel, Vietnam, and others declaring independence, although rarely without bloodshed. The decade also witnessed the early beginnings of new technologies (such as computers, nuclear power, and jet propulsion), often first developed in tandem with the war effort, and later adapted and improved upon in the post-war era. The world population increased from about 2.25 to 2.5 billion over the course of the decade, with about 850 million births and 600 million deaths in total.

Politics and wars

Wars 

 World War II (1939–1945)
 Nazi Germany invades Poland, Denmark, Norway, Benelux, and the French Third Republic from 1939 to 1941.
 Soviet Union invades Poland, Finland, occupies Latvia, Estonia, Lithuania and Romanian region of Bessarabia from 1939 to 1941.
 Germany faces the United Kingdom in the Battle of Britain (1940). It was the first major campaign to be fought entirely by air forces, and was the largest and most sustained aerial bombing campaign up until that date.
 Germany attacks the Soviet Union (June 22, 1941).
 The United States enters World War II after the attack on Pearl Harbor on December 7, 1941. It would face the Empire of Japan in the Pacific War.
 Germany, Italy, and Japan suffer defeats at Stalingrad, El Alamein, and Midway in 1942 and 1943.
 Warsaw Ghetto Uprising in 1943 was the largest Jewish uprising in Nazi-occupied Poland.
 Warsaw Uprising against Nazis in 1944 in Poland was the single largest military effort taken by any European resistance movement during World War II.The United States Army Air Forces send support for Poles on September 18, 1944, when flight of 110 B-17s of the 3 division Eighth Air Force airdropped supply for soldiers.
 Normandy landings. The forces of the Western Allies land on the beaches of Normandy in Northern France (June 6, 1944).
 Yalta Conference, wartime meeting from February 4, 1945, to February 11, 1945, among the heads of government of the United States, the United Kingdom, and the Soviet Union—President Franklin D. Roosevelt, Prime Minister Winston Churchill, and Premier Joseph Stalin, respectively—for the purpose of discussing Europe's postwar reorganization, intended to discuss the re-establishment of the nations of war-torn Europe.
 The Holocaust, also known as The Shoah (Hebrew: , Latinized ha'shoah; Yiddish: , Latinized  or ) is the term generally used to describe the genocide of approximately six million European Jews during World War II, a program of systematic state-sponsored extermination by Nazi Germany, under Adolf Hitler, its allies, and collaborators. Some scholars maintain that the definition of the Holocaust should also include the Nazis' systematic murder of millions of people in other groups, including ethnic Poles, the Romani, Soviet civilians, Soviet prisoners of war, people with disabilities, gay men, and political and religious opponents. By this definition, the total number of Holocaust victims is between 11 million and 17 million people.
 The German Instrument of Surrender signed (May 7–8, 1945). Victory in Europe Day.
 Atomic bombings of Hiroshima and Nagasaki (August 6 and August 9, 1945); Surrender of Japan on August 15.
 World War II officially ends on September 2, 1945.
Indo-Pakistani wars and conflicts
Indo-Pakistani War of 1947
 Arab–Israeli conflict (Early 20th century–present)
 1948 Arab–Israeli War (1948–1949) – The war was fought between the newly declared State of Israel and its Arab neighbours. The war commenced upon the termination of the British Mandate of Palestine in mid-May 1948. After the Arab rejection of the 1947 United Nations Partition Plan for Palestine (UN General Assembly Resolution 181) that would have created an Arab state and a Jewish state side by side, Egypt, Iraq, Jordan, Lebanon and Syria attacked the state of Israel. In its conclusion, Israel managed to defeat the Arab armies.
Indonesian War of Independence (1945-1949)
First Indochina War (1946-1954)

Major political changes
 Establishment of the United Nations Charter (June 26, 1945) effective (October 24, 1945).
 Establishment of the defence alliance NATO April 4, 1949.

Internal conflicts
 1947–1948 Civil War in Mandatory Palestine.
 Victory of Chinese Communist Party led by Mao Zedong in the Chinese Civil War.
 Beginning of Greek Civil War, which extends from 1946 to 1949.

Decolonization and independence

 1944 – Iceland declares independence from Denmark.
 1945 – Indonesia declares independence from the Netherlands (effective in 1949 after a bitter armed and diplomatic struggle).
 1945 - Korea is liberated after Japan surrenders.
 1946 – The French Mandate for Syria and the Lebanon dissolves to the independent states of Syria and Lebanon. The French settlers are forced to evacuate the French colony in Syria.
 1947 – The Partition of the Presidencies and provinces of British India into a secular Union of India and a predominantly Muslim Dominion of Pakistan. 
 1948 – British rule in Burma ends. The State of Israel is established.
 1949 – The People's Republic of China is officially proclaimed.

Prominent political events 

 Postwar occupations of Germany and Japan from 1945.
 The 1946 Italian institutional referendum replaces the monarchy with a republic.
 Dissolution of the League of Nations on 20 April 1946. Much of its assets were transferred to the United Nations.

Economics

The Bretton Woods Conference was the gathering of 730 delegates from all 44 Allied nations at the Mount Washington Hotel, situated in Bretton Woods, New Hampshire, United States, to regulate the international monetary and financial order after the conclusion of World War II. The conference was held from July 1–22, 1944. It established the International Bank for Reconstruction and Development (IBRD) and the International Monetary Fund (IMF), and created the Bretton Woods system.

Assassinations and attempts 
Prominent assassinations, targeted killings, and assassination attempts include:

 August 20, 1940 – Leon Trotsky, a Russian revolutionary and Soviet politician is attacked by Ramón Mercader using an ice axe. Trotsky died the next day from exsanguination and shock.
 May 27, 1942 – Reinhard Heydrich, a high-ranking Nazi official who played a key role in the Holocaust, helping to develop the Final Solution, is assassinated with a converted anti-tank mine in an attack by two British-trained and equipped Czech paratroopers in Prague, dying of his wounds on June 4.
 December 24, 1942 – François Darlan, French Admiral and political figure is assassinated by Fernand Bonnier de La Chapelle in Algiers, French Algeria.
 April 18, 1943 – In a targeted killing, Japanese admiral Isoroku Yamamoto, who oversaw the operation against Pearl Harbor, is killed when the bomber transporting him is shot down by P-38 fighters over Bougainville.
 July 20, 1944 – Adolf Hitler, German fascist dictator is attacked with a bomb by anti-Nazi Colonel Claus von Stauffenberg and others of the German resistance in the 20th July plot. Hitler survives with minor wounds and the suspects are either arrested or executed.
 January 30, 1948 – Mahatma Gandhi, Indian activist and leader of the Indian independence movement is assassinated by Nathuram Godse using a pistol.

Science and technology

Technology
 The Atanasoff-Berry computer is now considered one of the first electronic digital computing device built by John Vincent Atanasoff and Clifford Berry at Iowa State University during 1937–1942. 
 Construction in early 1941 of the Heath Robinson Bombe & the Colossus computer, which was used by British codebreakers at Bletchley Park and satellite stations nearby to read Enigma encrypted German messages during World War II. This was operational until 1946 when it was destroyed under orders from Winston Churchill. This is now widely regarded as the first operational computer which in a model rebuild still today has a remarkable computing speed.
 The Z3 as world's first working programmable, fully automatic computing machine was built.
 The first test of technology for an atomic weapon (Trinity test) as part of the Manhattan Project.
 The sound barrier was broken in October, 1947.
 The transistor was invented in December, 1947 at Bell Labs.
 The development of radar.
 The development of ballistic missiles.
 The development of jet aircraft.
 The Jeep.
 The development of commercial television.
 The Slinky.
 The microwave oven.
 The invention of Velcro.
 The invention of Tupperware.
 The invention of the Frisbee.
 The invention of hydraulic fracturing.

Science
 Physics: the development of quantum theory and nuclear physics.
 Mathematics: the development of game theory and cryptography.
 In 1947, Thor Heyerdahl's raft Kon-Tiki crossed the Pacific Ocean from Peru to Tahiti proving the practical possibility that people from South America could have settled Polynesia in pre-Columbian times, rather than South-East Asia as it was previously believed.
 Willard Libby developed radiocarbon dating—a process that revolutionized archaeology.
 The development of the modern evolutionary synthesis.

Popular culture

Film

 Oscar winners: Rebecca (1940), How Green Was My Valley (1941), Mrs. Miniver (1942), Casablanca (1943), Going My Way (1944), The Lost Weekend (1945), The Best Years of Our Lives (1946), Gentleman's Agreement (1947), Hamlet (1948), All the King's Men (1949).
 Some of Hollywood's most notable blockbuster films of the 1940s include: The Maltese Falcon directed by John Huston (1941), It's a Wonderful Life directed by Frank Capra (1946), Double Indemnity directed by Billy Wilder (1944), Meet Me in St. Louis directed by Vincente Minnelli (1944), Casablanca directed by Michael Curtiz (1942), Citizen Kane directed by Orson Welles (1941), The Great Dictator directed by Charlie Chaplin (1940), The Big Sleep directed by Howard Hawks (1946), The Lady Eve directed by Preston Sturges (1941), The Shop Around the Corner directed by Ernst Lubitsch (1940), White Heat directed by Raoul Walsh (1949), Yankee Doodle Dandy directed by Michael Curtiz (1942), and Notorious directed by Alfred Hitchcock, (1946). The Walt Disney Studios released the animated feature films Pinocchio (1940), Dumbo (1941), Fantasia (1940), and Bambi (1942).

Although the 1940s was a decade dominated by World War II, important and noteworthy films about a wide variety of subjects were made during that era. Hollywood was instrumental in producing dozens of classic films during the 1940s, several of which were about the war and some are on most lists of all-time great films. European cinema survived although obviously curtailed during wartime and yet many films of high quality were made in the United Kingdom, France, Italy, the Soviet Union and elsewhere in Europe. The cinema of Japan also survived. Akira Kurosawa and other directors managed to produce significant films during the 1940s.

Polish filmmakers in Great Britain created anti-nazi color film Calling mr. Smith (1943) about current nazi crimes in occupied Europe during the war and about lies of nazi propaganda.

Film Noir, a film style that incorporated crime dramas with dark images, became largely prevalent during the decade. Films such as The Maltese Falcon and The Big Sleep are considered classics and helped launch the careers of legendary actors such as Humphrey Bogart and Ava Gardner. The genre has been widely copied since its initial inception.

In France during the war the tour de force Children of Paradise directed by Marcel Carné (1945), was shot in Nazi occupied Paris. Memorable films from post-war England include David Lean's Great Expectations (1946) and Oliver Twist (1948), Carol Reed's Odd Man Out (1947) and The Third Man (1949), and Powell and Pressburger's A Matter of Life and Death (1946), Black Narcissus (1946) and The Red Shoes (1948), Laurence Olivier's Hamlet, the first non-American film to win the Academy Award for Best Picture and Kind Hearts and Coronets (1949) directed by Robert Hamer. Italian neorealism of the 1940s produced poignant movies made in post-war Italy. Roma, città aperta directed by Roberto Rossellini (1945), Sciuscià directed by Vittorio De Sica (1946), Paisà directed by Roberto Rossellini (1946), La terra trema directed by Luchino Visconti (1948), The Bicycle Thief directed by Vittorio De Sica (1948), and Bitter Rice directed by Giuseppe De Santis (1949), are some well-known examples.

In Japanese cinema, The 47 Ronin is a 1941 black and white two-part Japanese film directed by Kenji Mizoguchi. The Men Who Tread on the Tiger's Tail (1945), and the post-war Drunken Angel (1948), and Stray Dog (1949), directed by Akira Kurosawa are considered important early works leading to his first masterpieces of the 1950s. Drunken Angel (1948), marked the beginning of the successful collaboration between Kurosawa and actor Toshiro Mifune that lasted until 1965.

Music

 Bing Crosby was the best selling pop artist of the 1940s. Crosby was the leading figure of the crooner sound as well as its most iconic, defining artist. By the 1940s, he was an entertainment superstar who mastered all of the major media formats of the day, movies, radio, and recorded music.
 The most popular music style during the 1940s was swing, which prevailed during World War II. In the later periods of the 1940s, less swing was prominent and crooners like Frank Sinatra, along with genres such as bebop and the earliest traces of rock and roll, were the prevalent genre.

Literature

 For Whom the Bell Tolls by Ernest Hemingway in 1940.
 The Myth of Sisyphus by Albert Camus in 1942.
 The Stranger by Albert Camus in 1942.
 The Little Prince by Antoine de Saint-Exupéry in 1943.
 Anti-Semite and Jew by Jean-Paul Sartre in 1943.
 The Fountainhead by Ayn Rand in 1943.
 No Exit by Jean-Paul Sartre in 1944.
 Pippi Longstocking by Astrid Lindgren in 1945.
 The Diary of Anne Frank by Anne Frank in 1947.
 Death of a Salesman by Arthur Miller in 1949.
 Nineteen Eighty-Four by George Orwell in 1949.
 The Glass Menagerie by Tennessee Williams in 1944.

Fashion

As the 1940s went through times of hardship during and after WWII, the solution was significant rationing and fashion items and fabrics were no exception. Fashion became more utilitarian or function and comfortability over style. Besides this rationing, as a tribute, women's fashion also changed to reflect that and it was seen in the new silhouette that is featured suits. In order to feminize this, certain elements were added such as the straight knee-length skirts and accessories to complete the look. Even with the challenges imposed by shortages in rayon, nylon, wool, leather, rubber, metal (for snaps, buckles, and embellishments), and even the amount of fabric that could be used in any one garment, the fashion industry's wheels kept chugging slowly along, producing what it could. After the fall of France in 1940, Hollywood drove fashion in the United States almost entirely, with the exception of a few trends coming from war torn London in 1944 and 1945, as America's own rationing hit full force, and the idea of function seemed to overtake fashion, if only for a few short months until the end of the war. Fabrics shifted dramatically as rationing and wartime shortages controlled import items such as silk and furs. Floral prints seem to dominate the early 1940s, with the mid-to-late 1940s also seeing what is sometimes referred to as "atomic prints" or geometric patterns and shapes. The color of fashion seemed to even go to war, with patriotic nautical themes and dark greens and khakis dominating the color palettes, as trousers and wedges slowly replaced the dresses and more traditional heels due to shortages in stockings and gasoline. The most common characteristics of this fashion were the straight skirt, pleats, front fullness, squared shoulders with v-necks or high necks, slim sleeves and the most favorited necklines were sailor, mandarin and scalloped.

People

Military leaders

  Field Marshal Erwin Rommel
  Reichsmarschall Hermann Göring
  Field Marshal Erich von Manstein
  Field Marshal Gerd von Rundstedt
  Marshal Ion Antonescu
  General Hideki Tōjō
  General Kuniaki Koiso
  Field Marshal Hajime Sugiyama
  Fleet Admiral Isoroku Yamamoto
  Fleet Admiral Osami Nagano
  Field Marshal Georgy Zhukov
  Field Marshal Ivan Konev
  General Dwight D. Eisenhower
  General George Marshall
  General Douglas MacArthur
  General Omar Bradley
  General George S. Patton
  Fleet Admiral Chester W. Nimitz
  Fleet Admiral Ernest J. King
  Field Marshal Harold Alexander
  Field Marshal Bernard Montgomery
  Général d'Armée Jean de Lattre de Tassigny
  Brigadier general Charles de Gaulle
  General Henri Winkelman
  General Bernhard of Lippe-Biesterfeld

Activists and religious leaders

 Joel Brand
 Behic Erkin
 Varian Fry
 Mohandas Gandhi
 Billy Graham
 Yitzhak HaLevi Herzog
 Muhammad Ali Jinnah
 Necdet Kent
 Aristides de Sousa Mendes
 Pope Pius XII
 Martha Sharp
 Waitstill Sharp
 Chiune Sugihara
 Raoul Wallenberg

Politics
 Abdel Rahman Azzam Pasha, Secretary-general Arab League
 Georgi Mikhailov Dimitrov, Chairman of the Executive Committee Communist International
 Camille Gutt, Managing Director International Monetary Fund
 Jacques Camille Paris, Secretary-general Council of Europe
 Edward Warner, President of the Council International Civil Aviation Organization
 John G. Winant, Director International Labour Organization

Actors / Entertainers

 Fred Allen
 Don Ameche
 Dana Andrews
 Edward Arnold
 Jean Arthur
 Fred Astaire
 Mary Astor
 Lauren Bacall
 Josephine Baker
 Lucille Ball
 Tallulah Bankhead
 Joseph Barbera
 Carl Barks
 Anne Baxter
 Ralph Bellamy
 Jack Benny
 William Bendix
 Ingrid Bergman
 Charles Bickford
 Vivian Blaine
 Humphrey Bogart
 Charles Boyer
 Walter Brennan
 Fanny Brice
 Lloyd Bridges
 Edgar Buchanan
 James Cagney
 Cab Calloway
 Yvonne De Carlo
 John Carradine
 Lon Chaney Jr.
 Charlie Chaplin
 Montgomery Clift
 Charles Coburn
 Claudette Colbert
 Ronald Colman
 Gary Cooper
 Katharine Cornell
 Abbott and Costello
 Joseph Cotten
 Joan Crawford
 Bing Crosby
 Arlene Dahl
 Dorothy Dandridge
 Linda Darnell
 Bette Davis
 Doris Day
 Olivia de Havilland
 William Demarest
 Richard Denning
 Marlene Dietrich
 Walt Disney
 Kirk Douglas
 Irene Dunne
 Duke Ellington
 Alice Faye
 José Ferrer
 Larry Fine
 Barry Fitzgerald
 Errol Flynn
 Henry Fonda
 Joan Fontaine
 Clark Gable
 Ava Gardner
 Judy Garland
 Greer Garson
 Lillian Gish
 Paulette Goddard
 Betty Grable
 Gloria Grahame
 Cary Grant
 Kathryn Grayson
 Virginia Grey
 Sydney Greenstreet
 Edmund Gwenn
 Carl Stuart Hamblen
 William Hanna
 Olivia de Havilland
 Helen Hayes
 Susan Hayward
 Rita Hayworth
 Van Heflin
 Katharine Hepburn
 William Holden
 Bob Hope
 Lena Horne
 Curly Howard
 Moe Howard
 Shemp Howard
 Walter Huston
 Pedro Infante
 Burl Ives
 Anne Jeffreys
 Van Johnson
 Glynis Johns
 Jennifer Jones
 Boris Karloff
 Danny Kaye
 Gene Kelly
 Deborah Kerr
 Alan Ladd
 Veronica Lake
 Hedy Lamarr
 Dorothy Lamour
 Burt Lancaster
 Laurel and Hardy
 Charles Laughton
 Peter Lawford
 Janet Leigh
 Vivien Leigh
 Norman Lloyd
 Gene Lockhart
 June Lockhart
 Carole Lombard
 Peter Lorre
 Myrna Loy
 Vera Lynn
 Ida Lupino
 Fred MacMurray
 Victor Mature
 Fredric March
 Herbert Marshall
 James Mason
 Burgess Meredith
 Ray Milland
 Carmen Miranda
 Marilyn Monroe
 Dennis Morgan
 Frank Morgan
 Harry Morgan
 Jorge Negrete
 Margaret O'Brien
 Maureen O'Hara
 Laurence Olivier
 Janis Paige
 Gregory Peck
 Walter Pidgeon
 Dick Powell
 Eleanor Powell
 Jane Powell
 William Powell
 Tyrone Power
 Robert Preston
 Anthony Quinn
 Claude Rains
 Basil Rathbone
 Ronald Reagan
 Donna Reed
 George Reeves
 Michael Redgrave
 Dolores del Río
 Edward G. Robinson
 Ginger Rogers
 Roy Rogers
 Cesar Romero
 Mickey Rooney
 Rosalind Russell
 George Sanders
 Joseph Schildkraut
 Lizabeth Scott
 Randolph Scott
 Jean Simmons
 Frank Sinatra
 Red Skelton
 Barbara Stanwyck
 James Stewart
 Lewis Stone
 Barry Sullivan
 Ed Sullivan
 Lyle Talbot
 Elizabeth Taylor
 Robert Taylor
 Shirley Temple
 The Three Stooges
 Gene Tierney
 Spencer Tracy
 Lana Turner
 Robert Walker
 John Wayne
 Orson Welles
 Richard Widmark
 Cornel Wilde
 Jane Wyman
 Keenan Wynn
 Loretta Young

Musicians

 Marian Anderson
 Louis Armstrong
 Eddy Arnold
 Gene Autry
 Pearl Bailey
 Benny Carter
 Ray Charles
 Charlie Barnet
 Count Basie
 Irving Berlin
 Al Bowlly
 Les Brown
 Erskine Butterfield
 Sammy Cahn
 Cab Calloway
 Nat King Cole
 Perry Como
 Bing Crosby
 Bob Crosby
 Miles Davis
 Willie Dixon
 Jimmy Dorsey
 Tommy Dorsey
 K. C. Douglas
 Champion Jack Dupree
 Billy Eckstine
 Duke Ellington
 H-Bomb Ferguson
 Ella Fitzgerald
 Ira Gershwin
 Dizzy Gillespie
 Benny Goodman
 Stéphane Grappelli
 Homer Harris
 Screamin' Jay Hawkins
 Richard Hayman
 Dick Haymes
 Earl Hines
 Billie Holiday
 John Lee Hooker
 Lena Horne
 Betty Hutton
 Sir Lancelot
 Big Joe Turner
 Bull Moose Jackson
 Mahalia Jackson
 Harry James
 Louis Jordan
 Blind Willie Johnson
 Al Jolson
 Kitty Kallen
 Danny Kaye
 Sammy Kaye
 Stan Kenton
 B.B. King
 Evelyn Knight
 Gene Krupa
 Frankie Laine
 Mario Lanza
 Peggy Lee
 Dean Martin
 Grady Martin
 Johnny Mercer
 Amos Milburn
 Glenn Miller
 Roy Milton
 Charles Mingus
 Thelonious Monk
 Vaughn Monroe
 Benny Moré
 Ray Noble
 Charlie Parker
 Les Paul
 Édith Piaf
 Cole Porter
 Bud Powell
 Louis Prima
 Django Reinhardt
 Pete Johnson
 Max Roach
 Marty Robbins
 Paul Robeson
 Richard Rodgers
 Artie Shaw
 Dinah Shore
 Frank Sinatra
 Memphis Slim
 Kate Smith
 Billy Strayhorn
 Maxine Sullivan
 Art Tatum
 Martha Tilton
 Ernest Tubb
 Sarah Vaughan
 T-Bone Walker
 Little Walter
 Muddy Waters
 Margaret Whiting
 Cootie Williams
 Hank Williams
 Tex Williams
 Bob Wills
 Teddy Wilson

Bands
 The Andrew Sisters
 The Boswell Sisters
 The Ink Spots
 The Merry Macs
 The Mills Brothers
 The Pied Pipers
 The Ravens
 The Robins
 Sons of The Pioneers

Sports

During the 1940s, sporting events were disrupted and changed by the events that engaged and shaped the entire world. The 1940 and 1944 Olympic Games were cancelled because of World War II. During World War II in the United States Heavyweight Boxing Champion Joe Louis and numerous stars and performers from American baseball and other sports served in the armed forces until the end of the war. Among the many baseball players (including well known stars) who served during World War II were Moe Berg, Joe DiMaggio, Bob Feller, Hank Greenberg, Stan Musial (in 1945), Warren Spahn, and Ted Williams. They like many others sacrificed their personal and valuable career time for the benefit and well-being of the rest of society. The Summer Olympics were resumed in 1948 in London and the Winter games were held that year in St. Moritz, Switzerland.

In 1947, Wataru Misaka of the New York Knicks became the first person of color to play in modern professional basketball, just months after Jackie Robinson had broken the color barrier in Major League Baseball for the Brooklyn Dodgers.

Baseball

During the early 1940s World War II had an enormous impact on Major League Baseball as many players including many of the most successful stars joined the war effort. After the war many players returned to their teams, while the major event of the second half of the 1940s was the 1945 signing of Jackie Robinson to a players contract by Branch Rickey the general manager of the Brooklyn Dodgers. Signing Robinson opened the door to the integration of Major League Baseball finally putting an end to the professional discrimination that had characterized the sport since the 19th century.
Roy Campanella
Joe DiMaggio
Bill Dickey
Larry Doby
Bob Feller
Josh Gibson
Hank Greenberg
Monte Irvin
Buck Leonard
Johnny Mize
Stan Musial
Satchel Paige
Branch Rickey
Jackie Robinson
Ted Williams

Boxing

During the mid-1930s and throughout the years leading up to the 1940s Joe Louis was an enormously popular Heavyweight boxer. In 1936, he lost an important 12 round fight (his first loss) to the German boxer Max Schmeling and he vowed to meet Schmeling once again in the ring. Louis' comeback bout against Schmeling became an international symbol of the struggle between the US and democracy against Nazism and Fascism. When on June 22, 1938, Louis knocked Schmeling out in the first few seconds of the first round during their rematch at Yankee Stadium, his sensational comeback victory riveted the entire nation. Louis enlisted in the U.S. Army on January 10, 1942, in response to the Japanese attack on Pearl Harbor. Louis' cultural impact was felt well outside the ring. He is widely regarded as the first African American to achieve the status of a nationwide hero within the United States, and was also a focal point of anti-Nazi sentiment leading up to and during World War II.
Buddy Baer
Ezzard Charles
Billy Conn
Rocky Graziano
Joe Louis
Sugar Ray Robinson
Max Schmeling
Jersey Joe Walcott
Tony Zale

Track and Field

See also

 1940s in television
 1940s in literature

Timeline
The following articles contain brief timelines listing the most prominent events of the decade.
1940 • 1941 • 1942 • 1943 • 1944 • 1945 • 1946 • 1947 • 1948 • 1949

Notes

References

Further reading
Lewis, Thomas Tandy, ed. The Forties in America. 3 volumes. Pasadena: Salem Press, 2011.
Lingeman, Richard. The Noir Forties: The American People from Victory to Cold War (New York: Nation Books, 2012. xii, 420 pp.)
 Yust, Walter, ed., 10 Eventful Years (4 vol., Chicago: Encyclopædia Britannica Inc, 1947), encyclopedia of world events 1937-46

External links

 Heroes of the 1940s - slideshow by Life magazine
 1940s.org

 
20th century
1940s decade overviews